Events from the year 1929 in China.

Incumbents
Chairman of the Nationalist government: Chiang Kai-shek
Premier: Tan Yankai
Vice Premier: Feng Yuxiang

Events

March
 March 5 – Yi Peiji was appointed as the president of the National Palace Museum and the curator of the antiquities museum by Nationalist Government.

April
April 1 – Zhifu is captured by rebel forces in course of the Warlord Rebellion in northeastern Shandong, and subsequently largely destroyed.
April 11 – Battle of Yichang in western Hubei between the armies of the Sichuan clique and New Guangxi clique
Mid-April – Zhang Zongchang's warlord rebel army in northeastern Shandong collapses as result of indiscipline and a government counter-offensive.

May
May 15: First Battle of Guilin: Hunan Army attacks Guilin, Guangxi
May 17–21: Second Battle of Guangzhou between New Guangxi clique and Guangdong Army

June
June 6 –  1929 Westlake exposition was opened.
June 7–18: Battle of Liuzhou, Guangxi between armies of New Guangxi clique and Hunan
June 21: Battle of Guiping in Guangxi between New Guangxi clique and the National Revolutionary Army

July
 July 25 – the Soviet government's Assistant Commissar of Foreign Affairs, Lev Karakhan, had issued a manifesto to the Chinese government promising the return of the Chinese Eastern Railway to Chinese control with no financial cost. (Sino-Soviet conflict (1929))

August
 August 26 – the Karakhan Manifesto was published by the Soviet press, but the document failed to mention neither the return of CER to the Chinese nor the lack of financial compensation. (Sino-Soviet conflict (1929))

September
September 23 – Liu Zhennian launches a campaign to crush the Red Spears' uprising in Shandong (1928–1929).

October 
October 10 –  the closing of the 1929 Westlake exposition.
October 18–24: battle at Zhengzhou, Henan between Feng Yuxiang's Northwest Army and National Revolutionary Army

November 
November – The Red Spear Society ceases to exist on the northern Shandong Peninsula as result of Liu Zhennian's counter-insurgency campaign.
November 20 – Taiping Fire and Marine Insurance, as predecessor of China Taiping Insurance was founded in Shanghai.
November 30 – end of battle of Heishiguan

December 
December – Gutian Congress

Births
 June 30 – Yang Ti-liang, senior Hong Kong judge
 October 13 – Walasse Ting, Chinese-American painter (d. 2010)
 December 29 – Shen Jilan, Chinese politician (d. 2020)
Dong Cunrui

Deaths
January 10 – Yang Yuting (warlord)
January 19 – Liang Qichao
February 20 – Su Zhaozheng
August 30 – Peng Pai

References

 
1920s in China
Years of the 20th century in China